Tophouse, also known as Tophouse Settlement, is a rural locality in the Tasman District of New Zealand's South Island, some 8 km northeast of Saint Arnaud.  It is named after a hotel established in the 19th century to service drovers transporting their sheep between Canterbury and Marlborough.  The hotel is still in operation today and has an eventful history, including a double murder suicide in October 1894 (see below).  For many years, "Tophouse" referred specifically to the hotel, but it has also been used to refer to the general vicinity, and on 20 February 2001, the New Zealand Geographic Board assigned the name "Tophouse Settlement" to the area.

Tophouse is located near State Highway 63.  There were also plans to establish a significant railway junction in Tophouse.  One plan from the 1880s for the route of the Main North Line from Christchurch to Marlborough and Nelson proposed extending the Waiau Branch line (then terminated in Culverden) via Hanmer Springs to Tophouse, and then building one branch down the Wairau River valley to Blenheim and another to Nelson.  This proposal remained under consideration until the 1930s, when a coastal route via Parnassus and Kaikoura was chosen instead of the inland Tophouse route.

The Tophouse Tragedy 
What became known as the "Tophouse Tragedy" occurred in October 1894, when the owners of the hotel, Nathaniel and Louisa Longney, were away in Blenheim, having left their cousin, John Lane, in charge of the business, and a governess, Miss Catherine Wylie, looking after their three children. The brother of Mrs Longney, a Mr William (Bill) Bateman, who was rumoured to have been trying unsuccessfully to court Miss Wylie, heard of this arrangement and apparently became jealous.

Bateman travelled to the Tophouse hotel, arriving on the evening of Thursday, October 4, and convinced Lane to go out rabbit shooting with him. He then shot Lane in the back of the head, and dragged his body into the bushes. Bateman then went the 300m to the nearby telegraph station, and told the telegraphist, William Wallis, that Lane wanted to talk to him. When Wallis accompanied Bateman, he too was shot, his body being concealed under a horse-cover. During the night, Bateman repeatedly threatened Miss Wylie and Mrs Wallis, who locked herself in the telegraph station and tried to call for help, but did not shoot either woman.

When the police arrived the following evening, alerted by Mrs Wallis' attempts at calling for help, they found Bateman on the verandah of the hotel, having shot himself in the head with his muzzle-loading shotgun. To accomplish this he had removed his shoes and socks and placed his toe on the trigger, putting the barrel of the gun under his chin. The shot went through his head, and the blast holes can still be seen in the roof-boards of the verandah even today.

External links 
Decisions of the New Zealand Geographic Board, 20 February 2001: includes the assignment of the name Tophouse Settlement
History of Tophouse
Newspaper Report on the Tragedy

Populated places in the Tasman District
Hotels in New Zealand
Buildings and structures in the Tasman District